Catocala diversa is a moth of the family Erebidae first described by Carl Geyer in 1826. It is found in Spain, south-eastern France, Italy, the Balkans, European southern Russia and Israel.

There is one generation per year. Adults are on wing from May to July.

The larvae feed on Quercus species.

References

External links

Fauna Europaea
Lepiforum e.V.

diversa
Moths described in 1826
Moths of Europe
Moths of Asia
Taxa named by Carl Geyer